Eyam Hall is a Jacobean-style manor house in Eyam in Derbyshire.

History
The Wright family were landowners in Eyam although their family was historically  based in Longstone. William Wright gave his land in Eyam to his second son Thomas who is credited with building the hall. Thomas's son John sold his father's house in Unthank and based his branch of the family in Eyam. The hall began life as a generous wedding present in 1671 for John Wright and his new wife Elizabeth. It has been in the Wright family for nine generations and is currently a family home and wedding venue that opens at different times of the year.  The historic house is situated in picturesque part of Derbyshire and is an unspoilt example of a gritstone Jacobean manor house. The National Trust leased the hall for 5 years in March 2013, however, their lease has now ended and the Hall is back in the hands of the family full-time.

General information
The Hall and garden are open at different times each year. There is a craft centre and restaurant adjacent to the hall. The shops and cafe are open all year round (except January) from 10 to 4.30 p.m. Eyam Hall is a Grade II* listed building.

See also
 Grade II* listed buildings in Derbyshire Dales
 Listed buildings in Eyam
 List of places in Derbyshire

References

External links
 
 Eyam Hall & Craft Centre - National Trust

Grade II* listed buildings in Derbyshire
Country houses in Derbyshire
Gardens in Derbyshire
Historic house museums in Derbyshire
Tourist attractions of the Peak District
Grade II* listed houses
Jacobean architecture
Houses completed in the 17th century
Derbyshire Dales